Armazém is a municipality in the Brazilian state of Santa Catarina. Is located at latitude 28º15'43" south and longitude 49º01'03" west, with an elevation of 30 meters. The city's streets are embellished with manicured gardens. Armazém has an area of 138.6 km ² and was emancipated from the city of Tubarão on December 19, 1958.

Municipal Data
Municípios limítrofes: Braço do Norte, Rio Fortuna, São Martinho, Imarui e Gravatal.
Área: 173,578 km²
Population: 8,759 (2020)
Altitude: 30 m
Tourist Region: Encantos do Sul
Mais informações você encontra no site da prefeitura municipal de Armazém

References

Municipalities in Santa Catarina (state)